Charles William Harris (born 25 March 1933), better known by his stage name of Wee Willie Harris, is an English rock and roll singer.  He is best known for his energetic stage shows and TV performances since the 1950s, when he was known as "Britain's wild man of rock 'n' roll".

Life and career
Born in Bermondsey, Harris left his job at a Peek Freans bakery in London to start his music career. He began performing at The 2i's Coffee Bar in Soho, London, where he was the resident piano player, performing with Tommy Steele, Adam Faith, Screaming Lord Sutch and others.  He was named for his 5' 2" height, and in tribute to Little Richard. In November 1957, he was picked by the TV producer, Jack Good, to appear in the BBC show Six-Five Special. His appearances on the show led to concerns being expressed in the media about the BBC's role in "promoting teenage decadence". His debut single, the self-penned "Rockin' At the 2 I's", was released on the Decca label in December 1957, and was followed by several others, although none reached the UK Singles Chart.

He became a popular performer on TV shows and in live performances, and was known for his unrelenting energy, multicoloured dyed hair (often green, orange or pink), and clothes including "larger-than-life stage jackets that looked like the coat hanger was still inside, tight drainpipe trousers, and a huge polka-dot bow tie". Another critic wrote that: "He gyrates like an exploding Catherine wheel, emitting growls, squeals and what sounds like severe hiccupping". Paul McCartney and John Lennon reportedly queued for his autograph when he played in Liverpool in 1958. According to Harris, the idea for dyeing his hair pink originally came from his manager, professional wrestler and wrestling promoter Paul Lincoln, who was inspired by American wrestler Gorgeous George.

In May 1960, he joined a tour of the UK featuring Conway Twitty, Freddy Cannon and Johnny Preston. He continued to record in the 1960s, for HMV, Polydor and Parlophone, and continued to perform in the UK as well as in Israel, Spain and elsewhere, and on cruise ships.

In the mid 1970s, he lived in Prestwich, near Manchester.  He resurfaced in the late 1970s as a nostalgia act, after Ian Dury mentioned him in the song "Reasons to be Cheerful, Part 3".  Harris later recorded an album dedicated to Dury, Twenty Reasons To Be Cheerful (2000), and his early recordings were released on CD in 1999. In 1991, he briefly featured in the video for Hale & Pace's "The Stonk" contribution to Comic Relief and, in 2003, he released the album Rag Moppin''', backed by the Alabama Slammers.

In 2005, Harris appeared as a "mystery guest" on the comedy music quiz programme Never Mind the Buzzcocks, and was easily identified. In 2011, he was interviewed by Melvyn Bragg as part of the series Reel History of Britain, talking about rock and roll in Britain.

Rollercoaster Records published I Go Ape! - The Wee Willie Harris Story by Rob Finnis, a 88 page illustrated biography accompanied by a 30-track CD, featuring the best of Harris's rock and roll recordings, in 2018.

Discography
Singles
"Rockin' At The 2 I's" / "Back To School Again" (Decca, 1957)
"Love Bug Crawl" / "Rosie Lee" (Decca, 1958)
"Got A Match" / "No Chemise, Please!" (Decca, 1958)
"Wild One" / "Little Bitty Girl"  (Decca, 1960)
"You Must Be Joking" / "Better To Have Loved" (HMV, 1963)
"Listen to the River Roll Along" / "Try Moving Baby" (Polydor, 1966)
"Someone's in the Kitchen With Diana" / "Walk With Peter And Paul" (Parlophone, 1966)
"Together" / "Rock 'n' Roll Jamboree"  (Decca, 1974)

EPsRocking With Wee Willie (Decca, 1958)I Go Ape (Arton, 1960)

AlbumsI Go Ape (Arton, 1962)Wee Willie Harris Goes Ape (Ace 178, 1986)Twenty Reasons To Be Cheerful (Fury, 2000)Rag Moppin' (Pollytone, 2003)I Go Ape - Rockin' With Wee Willie Harris'' (Rollercoaster, 2018)

References

1933 births
Living people
English pop singers
English male singers
English pop pianists
People from Bermondsey
British rock and roll musicians
British male pianists
21st-century pianists
21st-century British male musicians